Obed Malolo (born 18 April 1997) is a Finnish football player who plays as a midfielder for HIFK. He is of Congolese descent.

Club career
On 7 January 2022, he signed a one-year contract with HIFK.

Career statistics

References

External links
Obed Malolo at HJK Helsinki

1997 births
Living people
Finnish footballers
Helsingin Jalkapalloklubi players
Klubi 04 players
Seinäjoen Jalkapallokerho players
Rovaniemen Palloseura players
AC Oulu players
HIFK Fotboll players
Veikkausliiga players
Finland youth international footballers
Footballers from Helsinki
Association football midfielders
Finnish people of Democratic Republic of the Congo descent